Shovelhead may refer to:
Harley-Davidson Shovelhead engine, an engine produced by Harley-Davidson from 1966 to 1984
Bonnethead, the bonnethead shark, Sphyrna tiburo